During the 2003–04 season, Red Star Belgrade participated in the 2003–04 First League of Serbia and Montenegro, 2003–04 Serbia and Montenegro Cup and 2003–04 UEFA Cup.

Season summary
Red Star won their eighth double in this season.

Squad

Results

Overview

First League of Serbia and Montenegro

Serbia and Montenegro Cup

UEFA Cup

Qualifying round

First round

Second round

See also
 List of Red Star Belgrade seasons

References

Red Star Belgrade seasons
Red Star
Serbian football championship-winning seasons